Ride or Die is the third solo album by Devon Allman, released in 2016. The core lineup consisted of Tom Hambridge (drums), Tyler Stokes (guitars) and Steve Duerst (bass). Additional artists included Ron Holloway (saxophone), Bobby Yang (strings) and Kevin McKendree (keyboard).

Recording, production 
Ride or Die was recorded at Nashville’s Sound Stage Studios and Switchyard Studios in May, 2016. It was produced by Devon Allman, and co-produced, mixed and mastered by Tom Hambridge.

Track listing

Personnel 
Devon Allman - gutars, vocals, bass on tracks 7-12
Tom Hambridge - drums, percussion
Tyler Stokes - guitars, bass on track 5
Steve Duerst - bass on tracks 1-4 & 6
Ron Holloway - saxophone
Bobby Yang - violin, string section on track 7
Kevin McKendree - keyboards

Charts 
Ride or Die debuted at #1 on Billboard's Blues Albums the week of October 8, 2016.

References

External links 
 Devon Allman Band

2016 albums
Devon Allman albums